Celtiberian or Northeastern Hispano-Celtic is an extinct Indo-European language of the Celtic branch spoken by the Celtiberians in an area of the Iberian Peninsula between the headwaters of the Douro, Tagus, Júcar and Turia rivers and the Ebro river. This language is directly attested in nearly 200 inscriptions dated to the 2nd and 1st centuries BC, mainly in Celtiberian script, a direct adaptation of the northeastern Iberian script, but also in the Latin alphabet. The longest extant Celtiberian inscriptions are those on three Botorrita plaques, bronze plaques from Botorrita near Zaragoza, dating to the early 1st century BC, labeled Botorrita I, III and IV (Botorrita II is in Latin).

Overview
Enough is preserved to show that the Celtiberian language could be Q-Celtic (like Goidelic), and not P-Celtic like Gaulish or Brittonic.

Celtiberian and Gaulish are grouped together as Continental Celtic languages, but this grouping is paraphyletic: no evidence suggests the two shared any common innovation separately from Insular Celtic.

Celtiberian has a fully inflected relative pronoun ios (as does, for instance, Ancient Greek), not preserved in other Celtic languages, and the particles  'and' < *kʷe (cf. Latin -, Attic Greek  te),  'nor' < *ne-kʷe (cf. Latin ),  'also, as well' < *h₂et(i)-kʷe (cf. Lat. , Gaulish ate, OIr. aith 'again'), ve "or" (cf. Latin enclitic  and Attic Greek  ē < Proto-Greek *ē-we). As in Welsh, there is an s-subjunctive,  "he shall take" (Old Irish gabid), robiseti, auseti. Compare Umbrian ferest "he/she/it shall make" or Ancient Greek   (aorist subj.) /   (future ind.) "(that) he/she/it shall show".

Phonology

Celtiberian was a Celtic language that shows the characteristic sound changes of Celtic languages such as:

PIE Consonants

 PIE *bʰ, *dʰ, *gʰ > b, d, g: Loss of Proto-Indo-European voiced aspiration.
Celtiberian and Gaulish placename element  'hill, town, akro-polis' < *bʰr̥ǵʰ-eh₂;
 'they are watered' < *nebʰ-i-nt-or; 
 'he must build' < *dʰingʰ-bī-tōd,  'to build around > to enclose' < *h₂m̥bi-dʰingʰ-o-mn-ei (cf. Latin  'to build, shape' < *dʰingʰ-o, Old Irish cunutgim 'erect, build up' < *kom-ups-dʰingʰ-o),  '(that someone) builds around > enclose' < *h₂m̥bi-dʰingʰ-s-e-ti. 
 'mandatory, required' < *gʰor-ti-ka (cfr. Latin  'exhort' < *ex-gʰor-to);
 'daughter' < *dʰugh₂tēr,  'grandson, son of the daughter' (Common Celtic );
 'mine' < *bʰedʰ-yo 'that is pierced'.
 PIE *kʷ: Celtiberian preserved the PIE voiceless labiovelar kʷ (hence Q-Celtic), a development also observed in Archaic Irish and Latin. On the contrary Brythonic or P-Celtic (as well as some dialects of Ancient Greek and some Italic branches like P-Italic) changed kʷ to  p. -kue 'and' < *kʷe, Latin -que, Osco-Umbrian -pe 'and', neip 'and not, neither' < *ne-kʷe.
 PIE *ḱw > ku:  horse (in ethnic name ekualakos) < *h₁eḱw-ālo (cf. Middle Welsh ebawl 'foal' < *epālo, Latin  'horse', OIr. ech 'horse' < *eko´- < *h₁eḱwo-, OBret. eb < *epo- < *h₁eḱwo-);
Old Irish Ferchú < *Virokū,  Old Welsh Gurcí < *Virokū 'idem.'.
 PIE *gʷ > b: bindis 'legal agent' < *gʷiHm-diks (cfr. Latin vindex 'defender');
 'cow passage' < *gʷow-(e)ito (cfr. OIr bòthar 'cow passage' < *gʷow-(e)itro), and boustom 'cowshed' < *gʷow-sto.
 PIE *gʷʰ > gu:  < *gʷʰedʰ-y-ont 'imploring, pleading'. Common Celtic  'ask, plead, pray', OIr. guidid, W. .
 PIE  *p > *φ > ∅: Loss of PIE *, e.g.  (Celtiberian, Old Irish and Old Breton) vs. Latin  and Sanskrit .  acc. pl. fem. 'six feet, unit of measure' (< *φodians < *pod-y-ans *sweks);
 'stone building' < *pl̥-ya (cfr. OIr. ail 'boulder');
 'higher' < *uφamos < *up-m̥os;
 'remainder, rest' < *uper-n̥tiyo (cfr. Latin ).
Toponym  now Ledaña 'broad place' < *pl̥th2-ny-a.

Consonant clusters

 PIE *mn > un: as in Lepontic, Brittonic and Gaulish, but not Old Irish and seemingly not Galatian.  'neighbour' < *kom-ness-o < *Kom-nedʰ-to (cf. OIr. comnessam 'neighbour' < *Kom-nedʰ-t-m̥o).
 PIE *pn > un:  < *kleun-y-a < *kleup-ni 'meadow' (Cfr. OIr. clúain 'meadow' < *klouni). However, in Latin *pn > mn:  'damage' < *dHp-no.
 PIE *nm > lm: Only in Celtiberian.  < *men-mōn 'intelligence',  'gifted with mind' < *men-mn̥-tyo (Cfr. OIr. menme 'mind' < *men-mn̥. Also occurs in modern Spanish:  'soul' < *anma < Lat. , Asturian galmu 'step' < Celtic .
 PIE *ps > *ss / s:  'he must excavate (lit. up/over-dig)' < *ups-ad-bʰiH-tōd,  * < *useziu < *ups-ed-yō 'highest'. The ethnic name  in Latin (contesikum in native language), recall the proper name  'warm-hearted, friendly' (< *kom-tep-so, cf. OIr. tess 'warm' > *tep-so). In Latin epigraphy that sound is transcribed with geminated:  'of the Usseitici' < *Usseito < *upse-tyo. However, in Gaulish and Brittonic *ps > *x (cf. Gaulish Uxama, MW. uchel, 'one six').
 PIE *pt > *tt / t:  'seventh' (< *septmo-to). However, in Gaulish and Insular Celtic *pt > x: sextameto 'seventh', Old Irish sechtmad (< *septmo-e-to).
 PIE *gs > *ks > *ss / s: sues 'six' < *sweks;
 'south/right city' (Celts oriented looking east) < *dekso-*bʰr̥ǵʰa; ** 'strength town' < *h₂ner-to-*bʰr̥ǵʰs;
es- 'out of, not' < *eks < *h₁eǵʰs (cf. Lat. ex-, Common Celtic , OIr. ess-). In Latin epigraphy that sound its transcript with geminated:  < *sweks- 'the sixth city' (cfr. Latin )
 < *deks-ika. However, in Gaulish *ks > *x: Dexivates.
 PIE *gt > *kt > *tt / t:  'constructions, buildings' < *dʰigʰ-tas (= Latin );
 'load' < *louttu < *louktu < *leugʰ-tu;
 'it is permitted',  'it is not permitted' (< *l(e)ik-to, cf. Latin  < *lik-e-to). But Common Celtic *kt > *xt: luxtu < *louktu < *leugʰ-tu, OIr. lucht.
Celtiberian  'right born, lawful' < *h₃reg-tō-genos, Gaulish Rextugenos. In Latin epigraphy that sound is transcribed with geminated:  'noble' < *brikto < *bʰr̥ǵʰ-to.
 'fruitful' < *bruktio < *bʰruHǵ-t-y-o (cfr. Latin  'profitable').
 PIE *st > *st: against Gaulish, Irish and Welsh (where the change was *st > ss) preservation of the PIE cluster *st.  'excellent' < * 'excellence' < *gus-tu. Old Irish gussu 'excellence' (cfr. Fergus < *viro-gussu), Gaulish gussu (Lezoux Plate, line 7).

Vowels

 PIE *e, *h₁e > e:  'in Togotis' < *h₁en-i (cf. Lat. in, OIr. in 'into, in'),  'inside of this territory', es- 'out of, not' < *eks < *h₁eǵʰs (cf. Lat. ex-, Common Celtic , OIr. ess-),  'not enclosed, open' lit. 'unfenced' < *h₁eǵʰs-*h₂enk-yos,  'settlement, town',  'conventus, capital' < *kom-treb-ya (cf. OIr. treb, W. tref 'settlement'),  horse < *h₁ekw-os,  'horseman'.
 PIE *h₂e > a:  'fenced, enclosed' < *h₂enk-yos,  'strong' < *h₂ep-lō 'strength',  'valid, firm' < *h₂ewg-u, adj. 'strong, firm, valid'.
 PIE *o, *Ho > o:  (dat.sing.) 'for the last' (< *olzo 'last' < *h₂ol-tyo, cf. Lat.  < *h₂ol-t-m̥o. OIr. ollam 'master poet' < *oltamo < *h₂ol-t-m̥),  'mountain' (< *h₂ok-r-i, cf. Lat.  'mountain', OIr. ochair 'edge' < *h₂ok-r-i),  'memory' (< *monī-mā < *mon-eye-mā).
 PIE *eh₁ > ē > ī?. This Celtic reflex isn't well attested in Celtiberian. e.g. IE *h3rg'-s meaning "king, ruler" vs. Celtiberian -reiKis, Gaulish -rix, British rix, Old Irish, Old Welsh, Old Breton ri meaning "king". In any case, the maintenance of PIE ē = ē is well attested in  'he did' < *deked < *dʰeh₁k-et, identical to Latin fecit.
 PIE *eh₂ > ā:  'to burn' < *deh₂u-nei (Old Irish dóud, dód 'burn' < *deh₂u-to-),  'enough money, a considerable amount of money' (< *sātio < *she₂t-yo, Common Celtic  'sufficiency', OIr. sáith), kār 'friendship' (< *keh₂r, cf. Lat. cārus 'dear' < *keh₂r-os, Irish cara 'friend', W. caru 'love' < *kh₂r-os).
IE *dh3-td to Celtiberian  meaning 'he must give'. 'sentence' < *dʰoh₁m-eh₂ 'put, dispose' (cfr. Old Irish dán 'gift, skill, poem', Germanic dōma < *dʰoh₁m-o 'verdict, sentence').
 PIE *Hw- > w-: uta 'conj. and, prep. besides' (< *h₂w-ta, 'or, and', cfr, Umb. ute 'or', Lat. aut 'or' (< *h₂ew-ti).

Syllabic resonants and laryngeals

 PIE *n̥ > an / *m̥ > am:  'silver' < *h₂r̥gn̥to (cf. OIr. argat and Latin  ).  'path, way' *kanmano < *kn̥gs-mn̥-o (cf. OIr. céimm, OW. cemmein 'step'),  'tithe' < *dekm̥-et-a (cf. Gaulish decametos 'tenth', Old Irish dechmad 'tenth'), dekam 'ten' (cf. Lat. , Common Celtic dekam, OIr. deich < *dekm̥),  'the nine tribes',  'nine' < *h₁newn̥ (cf. Lat. novem, Common Celtic , OW. nauou < *h₁newn̥), ās 'we, us' (< *ans < *n̥s, Old Irish sinni < *sisni, *snisni 'we, us', cf. German uns < *n̥s),  < *tri-kn̥g-ta, lit. 'three horns, three boundaries' > 'civil parish, shire' (modern Spanish Tres Cantos.
 Like Common Celtic and Italic (SCHRIJVER 1991: 415, McCONE 1996: 51 and SCHUMACHER 2004: 135), PIE *CHC > CaC (C = any consonant, H = any laryngeal):  < *dh₃-tōd,  'they put' < *dʰh₁k-ont,  'propitious days' < *mh₂-tu (Latin  'good' < *meh₂-no, Old Irish maith 'good' < *mh₂-ti).
 PIE *CCH > CaC (C = any consonant, H = any laryngeal):  'prince' (< *mgh₂-i-lo, cf. OIr. mál 'prince' < *mgh₂-lo).
 PIE *r̥R > arR and *l̥R > alR (R = resonant):  'part, share' < *φarsna < *parsna < *pr̥s-nh₂. Common Celtic  < *prasna < *pr̥s-nh₂, cf. Old Irish ernáil 'part, share'.
 PIE *r̥P > riP and *l̥P > liP (P = plosive):  PiRiKanTi < *bʰr̥ǵʰ-n̥ti.  'silver coined' < *kom-skl̥-to 'to cut'.
 PIE *Cr̥HV > CarV and *Cl̥HV > CalV: sailo 'dung, slurry' *salyo < *sl̥H-yo (cf. Lat.  < *sl̥H-iwa, OIr. sal 'dirt' < *sl̥H-a),  'stone building' < *pl̥-ya (cf. OIr. ail 'boulder'), are- 'first, before' (Old Irish ar 'for', Gaulish are 'in front of', < *pr̥h₂i. Lat. prae- 'before' < *preh₂i).
 Like Common Celtic (JOSEPH 1982: 51 and ZAIR 2012: 37), PIE *HR̥C > aRC (H = any laringeal, R̥ any syllabic resonant, C = any consonant):  'silver' < *h₂r̥gn̥to, not **riganto.

Exclusive developments 
 Affrication of the PIE groups -*dy-, -*dʰy-. -*ty- > z/th (/θ/) located between vowels and of -*d, -*dʰ > z/th (/θ/) at the end of the word: adiza 'duty' < *adittia < *h₂ed-d(e)ik-t-ya;  'highest' < *ups-ed-yō;  'territory' < *teut-yō; rouzu 'red' < *reudʰy-ō; olzo 'last' < *h₂ol-tyo; ozas 'feet' < *pod-y-ans; datuz < *dh₃-tōd;  'free' (in: LOUZOKUM, MLH IV, K.1.1.) < *h₁leudʰy-ō (cf. Oscan loufir 'free man', Russian ljúdi 'men, people'.

Morphology

Noun cases

  'part, share' < *parsna < *pr̥s-nh₂. Common Celtic  < *prasna
  'witness' < *weidʰ-yo < *weidʰ- 'perceive, see' / vamos 'higher' < *up-m̥os
  'son, descendance' < *gen-ti. Common Celtic  'family'
  'load' < *louttu < *louktu < *leugʰ-tu. Common Celtic  < *louktu < *leugʰ-tu (oir. lucht).
  'daughter' < *dʰugh₂tēr. Common Celtic .

An -n- stem can be seen in melmu nom.sg. < *-ōn, melmunos gen. sg. (from Botorrita III, probably a name). It is notable that the genitive singular -o- stem ends in -o in Celtiberian, unlike the rest of Celtic (and Italic) where this ending is -ī

There is also a potential Vocative case, however this is very poorly attested, with only an ambiguous -e ending for o-stem nouns being cited in literature.

Demonstrative pronouns

Verbal Endings

Sample texts

First Botorrita plaque, side A 
One of four bronze plaques found in Botorrita, this text was written in eastern Celtiberian script. The other side consists of a list of names. (K.01.01.A)

 
all this (is) valid by order of the competent authority

: all this (< *sod).
: final, valid (< *h₂eug-os 'strong, valid', cf. Latin  'solemn').
: of the competent authority (gen. sing.  < *pr̥Hi-steh₂-lo 'competent authority' < *pr̥Hi-sto 'what is first, authority').
: by order (instrumental fem. sing. < *dʰoh₁m-eh₂ 'establish, dispose').
(Translation: Prospér 2006)

 of these, he will give the tax inside of this territory, so be fenced as be unfenced

: of these (< *sa-ōm).
: the tithes, the tax.
: he will pay, will give.
: inside, in (< *h₁en-i).
: of this (loc. sing. < *so-sm-ei 'from this').
: territory (loc. sing. < *touzom 'territory' < *tewt-yo).
: so (be) fenced.
: as (be) unfenced.

(Transcription: Jordán 2004)

 In Togotis, he who draws water either for the green or for the farmland, the tithe (of their yield) he shall give

(Translation: De Bernardo 2007)

Great inscription from Peñalba de Villastar 
An inscription in the Latin alphabet in the Celtiberian sanctuary of Peñalba de Villastar, in the current municipality of Villastar, Teruel province. (K.03.03)

In Orosis and the surroundings of Tigino river, we dedicate the fields to Lugus.

: in (< *h₁en-i).
: Orosis (loc. sing. *oros-ei).
:  and (conj. cop.).
: of Tigino (river) (gen. sing. *tigin-o).
: in the surroundings (loc. sing. *tiatoun-ei < *to-yh₂eto-mn-ei).
: the furrows > the land cultivated (acc. pl. fem. erekaiās < *perka-i-ans).
: to Lugus.
: properly, totally, (may be a verbal complement > *pare-yanom, cfr. welsh iawn).
: we dedicate (present 3 p.pl. komeimu < *komeimuz < *kom-ei-mos-i).

 In Orosis and Equeiso the hills, the vegetable gardens [and] the houses are dedicated to Lugus.

: in Ekuoisu (loc. sing.)  -kue: and (< *-kʷe).
: the hills (nom. pl. < *h₂ok-r-eyes).
: the vegetable gardens (nom. pl. olokas < *olkās < *polk-eh₂-s).
: (and) the roofs > houses (nom. pl. togias < tog-ya-s).
: are they (dedicated) (3 p.pl. < *sistant < *si-sth₂-nti).
: to Lug (dat. Lugue-i).

(Transcription: Meid 1994, Translation: Prósper 2002)

Bronze plaque of Torrijo del Campo 
A bronze plaque found in Torrijo del Campo, Teruel province in 1996, using the eastern Celtiberian script.

 for those of the Lutorici included in the duty, and also of the Cartinoci, of the Lancici and of the Tritoci, must give enough  money to settle the debt with them.

: of the Lutorici ( gen. masc. pl.).
: for those included ( < *h1epi-s-o-bʰos).
: in the assignment, in the duty (loc. fem. sing. < *adittia < *ad-dik-tia. Cfr. Latin addictio 'assignment').
: and also (< *h₂et(i)kʷe).
: of the Cartinoci ( gen. masc. pl.).
: of the Lancici ( gen. masc. pl.).
: of the Tritoci ( gen. masc. pl.).
: money.
: enough (< *sātio < *seh₂t-yo).
: for them (dat.3 p.pl. ibus < *i-bʰos).
: to settle the debt (< *essato < *eks-h₂eg-to. Cfr. Latin ex-igo 'demand, require' & exactum 'identical, equivalent').
: must give (< *dh₃-tōd).

(Transcription and Translation: Prósper 2015)

See also
Celtiberian script
Botorrita plaque
Gallaecian language
Gaulish
Lepontic language
Iberian scripts
Continental Celtic languages
Pre-Roman peoples of the Iberian Peninsula
Lusitanian language

References

Sources

 Alberro, Manuel. The celticisation of the Iberian Peninsula, a process that could have had parallels in other European regions. In: Etudes Celtiques, vol. 35, 2003. pp. 7–24. [DOI: https://doi.org/10.3406/ecelt.2003.2149]; www.persee.fr/doc/ecelt_0373-1928_2003_num_35_1_2149
 Anderson, James M. "Preroman indo-european languages of the hispanic peninsula" . In: Revue des Études Anciennes. Tome 87, 1985, n°3-4. pp. 319–326. [DOI: https://doi.org/10.3406/rea.1985.4212]; [www.persee.fr/doc/rea_0035-2004_1985_num_87_3_4212]
 Hoz, Javier de. "Lepontic, Celtiberian, Gaulish and the archaeological evidence". In: Etudes Celtiques. vol. 29, 1992. Actes du IXe congrès international d'études celtiques. Paris, 7-12 juillet 1991. Deuxième partie : Linguistique, littératures. pp. 223–240. DOI: https://doi.org/10.3406/ecelt.1992.2006
 Hoz, Javier de. (1996). The Botorrita first text. Its epigraphical background; in: Die größeren altkeltischen Sprachdenkmäler. Akten des Kolloquiums Innsbruck 29. April - 3. Mai 1993, ed. W. Meid and P. Anreiter, 124–145, Innsbruck.
 Jordán Cólera, Carlos: (2004). Celtibérico. . University of Zaragoza, Spain.
 Joseph, Lionel S. (1982): The Treatment of *CRH- and the Origin of CaRa- in Celtic. Ériu n. 33 (31-57). Dublín. RIA.
 Lejeune, Michel (1955) Celtiberica Acta Salmanticensia: Filosofia y Letras, vol. 7, #4. Salamanca. Universidad de Salamanca.
 Lorrio, Alberto J. "Les Celtibères: archéologie et culture". In: Etudes Celtiques. vol. 33, 1997. pp. 7–36. DOI: https://doi.org/10.3406/ecelt.1997.2109
 Luján, Eugenio R. "Celtic and Celtiberian in the Iberian peninsula". In: E. Blasco et al. (eds.). Iberia e Sardegna. Le Monnier Universitá. 2013. pp. 97–112. 
 Luján, Eugenio R.; Lorrio, Alberto J. "Un puñal celtibérico con inscripción procedente de Almaraz (Cáceres, España)". In: Etudes Celtiques, vol. 43, 2017. pp. 113–126. DOI: https://doi.org/10.3406/ecelt.2017.1096
 McCone, Kim.(1996): Towards a relative chronology of ancient and medieval Celtic sound change Maynooth Studies in Celtic Linguistics 1. Maynooth. St. Patrick's College.
 Meid, Wolfgang. (1994). Celtiberian Inscriptions, Archaeolingua, edd. S. Bökönyi and W. Meid, Series Minor, 5, 12–13. Budapest.
 Schrijver, Peter (1991): The reflexes of the Proto-Indo-European laryngeals in Latin. Amsterdam. Ed. Rodopi.
 Schumacher, Stefan (2004): Die keltischen Primärverben: ein vergleichendes, etymologisches und morphologisches Lexikon. Innsbrucker Beiträge zur Sprachwissenschaft vol. 110. Universität Innsbruck.
 Untermann, Jürgen. (1997): Monumenta Linguarum Hispanicarum. IV Die tartessischen, keltiberischen und lusitanischen Inschriften, Wiesbaden.
 Velaza, Javier (1999): Balance actual de la onomástica personal celtibérica, Pueblos, lenguas y escrituras en la Hispania Prerromana, pp. 663–683.
 Villar, Francisco (1995): Estudios de celtibérico y de toponimia prerromana, Salamanca.
 Zair, Nicholas. (2012): The Reflexes of the Proto-Indo-European Laryngeals in Celtic. Leiden. Ed. Brill.

Further reading
General studies
 Beltrán Lloris, Francisco; Jordán Cólera, Carlos. "Celtibérico". In: Palaeohispanica: revista sobre lenguas y culturas de la Hispania antigua n. 20 (2020): pp. 631–688.  DOI: 10.36707/palaeohispanica.v0i20.395
 Blažek, Václav. "Celtiberian". In: Sborník prací Filozofické fakulty brněnské univerzity. N, Řada klasická = Graeco-Latina Brunensia. 2007, vol. 56, iss. N. 12, pp. [5]-25. .
 Jordán Cólera, Carlos (2007). "Celtiberian". e-Keltoi: Journal of Interdisciplinary Celtic Studies. Vol. 6: The Celts in the Iberian Peninsula. Article 17. pp. 749–850.  Available at: https://dc.uwm.edu/ekeltoi/vol6/iss1/17
 Stifter, David (2006). "Contributions to Celtiberian Etymology II". In: Palaeohispanica: revista sobre lenguas y culturas de la Hispania Antigua, 6. pp. 237–245. .

Specific themes
 Bernardo Stempel, Patrizia de. "Celtic ‘son’, ‘daughter’, other descendants, and *sunus in Early Celtic". In: Indogermanische Forschungen 118, 2013 (2013): 259–298. doi: https://doi.org/10.1515/indo.2013.118.2013.259
 Fernández, Esteban Ngomo. “A propósito de matrubos y los términos de parentesco en celtibérico”. In: Boletín del Archivo Epigráfico. Universidad Complutense de Madrid. nº. 4 (2019): 5-15.  
 Fernández, Esteban Ngomo. "El color rojo en celtibérico: del IE *H1roudh- al celtibérico routaikina". In: Boletín del Archivo Epigráfico. Universidad Complutense de Madrid. nº. 6 (junio, 2020): 5-19.  
 Simón Cornago, Ignacio; Jordán Cólera, Carlos Benjamín. "The Celtiberian S. A New Sign in (Paleo)Hispanic Epigraphy". In: Tyche 33 (2018). pp. 183–205.

External links

Detailed map of the Pre-Roman Peoples of Iberia (around 200 BC)
Celtic, Celtiberian - 2nd - 1st c. B.C. Examples of writing

Continental Celtic languages
Paleohispanic languages
Extinct languages of Spain